Mathond Madhuvena is a 2011 Kannada film in the comedy genre starring Anant Nag, Suhasini Maniratnam and Naveen Krishna in the lead roles. The film is a sequel to the 2010 hit film Eradane Maduve. The film has been directed and written by Dinesh Baboo and produced by Umesh Banakar and Anil Menasinakayi. Giridhar has composed the music.

Cast
 Anant Nag as Vishwanath 
 Suhasini Maniratnam as Malavika
 Jennifer Kotwal as Veena 
 Tara
 Naveen Krishna
 M. S. Umesh
 Priyanka Chandra as Mrudula 
 Sharan
 Raju Thalikote
 Veena Sundar

Reception

Critical response 

A critic from The Times of India scored the film at 3 out of 5 stars and says "The rest of the story follows with excellent  plots and a good climax. While Naveen Krishna is super, Priyanka excels. The Tara- Sharan jodia tickles your funny bone. Anant Nag and Suhasini are gracious. Music by Giridhar Dewan and cinematography by Suresh Bhyrasandra is good". Sunayana Suresh from DNA wrote "And scripts like these can work as textbooks to aspiring scriptwriters and directors. With this film managing to strike that right chord, we wonder if there’d be a part three as well".

References

2011 films
2010s Kannada-language films
Films directed by Dinesh Baboo